{{DISPLAYTITLE:2(x)ist}}

2(X)IST (pronounced "to exist") is an American luxury fashion label that makes men's underwear, swimwear, activewear, loungewear, socks, and watches. 2XIST also launched a women's line featuring activewear, sleepwear and intimates. The company was founded in 1991 by Gregory Sovell and is headquartered in New York City.

History
2(X)IST was founded in 1991 by Gregory Sovell, who left in 2005. The 2(X)IST headquarters is located in midtown Manhattan in New York City.

Notes

External links
 Official website

Underwear brands